Lieutenant General Sir Benjamin John Bathurst,  (born 15 April 1964) is a senior British Army officer.

Early life and education
Bathurst was born on 15 April 1964 in Haslemere, Surrey, England. He is the son of Admiral of the Fleet Sir Benjamin Bathurst. He was educated at Eton College, an all-boys public school in Berkshire. He studied at the University of Bristol, graduating with a Bachelor of Science degree in 1986, and at Cranfield University, graduating with a Master of Arts degree in 1996.

Military career
Bathurst was commissioned into the Welsh Guards in September 1983. He became commanding officer of the 1st Battalion Welsh Guards in July 2004. In 2005, he was appointed an Officer of the Order of the British Empire. He went on to be Director of Public Relations (Army) in September 2006, Deputy Director Strategy, Plans and Assessment in October 2008 and Commander, Initial Training Group in January 2010.

Bathurst became Director of Training in February 2011, Senior British Military Representative in Afghanistan in May 2014, and Major-General commanding the Household Division in June 2016. He was appointed a Commander of the Order of the British Empire in 2014, and awarded the United States Legion of Merit (Degree of Officer) in May 2018. He was appointed a Knight Commander of the Royal Victorian Order on 7 November 2019. In 2020, on completion of his tour at London District, he took up the appointment of UK Military Representative to NATO in the rank of lieutenant general. Bathurst was formally appointed promoted to lieutenant general on 13 March 2020 and also serves as the National Military Representative to the European Union.

References

 

|-

British Army lieutenant generals
British Army personnel of the Iraq War
British Army personnel of the War in Afghanistan (2001–2021)
British military personnel of The Troubles (Northern Ireland)
Knights Commander of the Royal Victorian Order
Commanders of the Order of the British Empire
Officers of the Legion of Merit
Welsh Guards officers
Ben
Military personnel from Surrey
People from Haslemere